Banan is a town in the Aleppo Governorate. It is the administrative center of a nahiya with the same name, and part of the As-Safira District.

Geography
The town is located to the southwest of the Sabkhat al-Jabbul, with an altitude of 508 meters. It is 23 km to the southeast of Aleppo, and 282 km from the capital Damascus.

Population
According to the 2004 census, the population was 4186, including 2171 males and 2015 females.

Transportation
The town was served by Aleppo International Airport.

References

Populated places in al-Safira District